The Austrian Institute of Economic Research is a private non-profit association located in Vienna, Austria.

The institute was founded in 1927 by Friedrich Hayek and Ludwig von Mises. With 124 employees (64 researchers, 30 research assistants, 30 administrative staff) it is the largest economic research institute in Austria. The current director is Gabriel Felbermayr who followed Christoph Badelt on 1 October 2021.  WIFO is a member of the "Association of European Conjuncture Institutes" (AIECE), the "Centre for International Research on Economic Tendency Surveys" (CIRET), and the "European Economic Research and Advisory Consortium" (ERECO) with partner institutions in Birmingham, Bologna, Cambridge, Madrid, Munich, Paris and Rotterdam. It has also established ties to institutes in the US, Australia and Asia.

Research Activities 

WIFO analyses national and international economic trends and supplies short- to medium-term economic forecasts. Together with studies on European integration, competitiveness and location of industries and services, these trends and forecasts provide the basis for economic policies and corporate strategies. Research activities are bundled in the following five departments:
 Macroeconomics and European Economic Policy
 Labour market, income and social security
 Industrial economics, innovation and international competition
 Structural change and regional developments
 Environment, agriculture and energy

WIFO's activities include commissioned research and consulting for domestic and international decision-making bodies, the European Commission, the OECD, major business and financial institutions. It has established an extensive information system of regularly updated economic statistics, including U.N. Foreign Trade Statistics, World Debt Tables of the World Bank, the IMF International Financial Statistics, OECD Main Economic Indicators, and OECD Economic Outlook. It also publishes journals, reports, newsletters, and periodicals.

Supervisory Board 
The Supervisory Board of WIFO is made up of Christoph Leitl (president of the Supervisory Board and of the Austrian Federal Economic Chamber), Rudi Kaske (vice president; president of the Federal Chamber of Labour) and other representatives of its main carrier organisations and the Austrian political, economic and academic community.

References

External links 
 Official Website (English Version)

Research institutes in Austria
1927 establishments in Austria
Economic research institutes
Organizations established in 1927